William J. Barker (December 23, 1831 – March 27, 1900) was an American politician who served as the mayor of Denver, Colorado from 1874 to 1876. He was a pioneer and moved to Denver in 1860, buying a large amount of property. 1876, Barker's last year as mayor office, is the same year Colorado was granted statehood. 

He is buried in the Fairmount Cemetery.

References

Mayors of Denver
1832 births
1900 deaths
19th-century American politicians
Burials at Fairmount Cemetery (Denver, Colorado)
People from Watkins Glen, New York